Reefer Madness: The History of Marijuana in America is a book by Larry "Ratso" Sloman, originally published in 1979. The book is a history of social marijuana use in the United States. The book was reissued in 1998 with an introduction by William S. Burroughs.

See also
 List of books about cannabis

1979 non-fiction books
1979 in cannabis
American books about cannabis
Non-fiction books about cannabis
Bobbs-Merrill Company books